Vanesa Romero Torres (born 4 June 1978) is a Spanish actress and model, mostly known for her roles as Ana in Aquí no hay quien viva and Raquel in La que se avecina.

In 1995 she was chosen dama del foc. In 1998 she became Miss Alicante 1998, so she participated as Miss España.

On 11 September 2012 she was married with Alberto Caballero after six years of romance, and they broke up the next year. She has three cats (Humphrey, Uma and Audrey) and two Yorkshire Terrier dogs (Lucas and Betty).

She hosted the 2012 Twelve Grapes with Jordi Sánchez.

From 28 March 2016 she uploads videos on YouTube. She published Reflexiones de una rubia, about his life, and it got good reviews.

Filmography

Films
 4 Años (2020) as Rosa
 El viajero (2017) as Lucía
 Save the Zombies (2013) as Mara
 La última mano (2012) as Eva
 9 meses (2010) as Clara
 The Sindone (2009) as María

Television series
 La que se avecina (2007-2021) as Raquel Villanueva
 Entre dos reinos (2011) as Leonor
 Aquí no hay quien viva (2005-2006) as Ana
 ¡Ala... Dina! (2000) as SuperLidia
 Una de dos (1999) as Loli

References

External links
 
 
 
 
 

1978 births
Living people
People from Alicante
Spanish YouTubers
21st-century Spanish actresses
Actresses from the Valencian Community
Spanish television actresses